Evangelismos is a location name derived from the Annunciation of Virgin Mary (Evangelismos tes Theotokou in Greek) and may refer to:

Evangelismos Hospital, a hospital in Athens
Evangelismos metro station, a metro station in Athens

Also Evangelismos may refer to the following places in Greece:

Evangelismos, Heraklion, part of the municipal unit of Kastelli, Heraklion regional unit
Evangelismos, Larissa, part of the municipality of Tempi, Larissa regional unit
Evangelismos, Elassona, part of the municipality of Elassona, Larissa regional unit
Evangelismos, Messenia, part of the municipal unit of Methoni, Messenia regional unit
Evangelismos, Thessaloniki, part of the municipal unit of Egnatia, Thessaloniki, regional unit